Polic can refer to:

 Polić, a surname
 Polic, an imprint of VDM Publishing